Paola Caracciolo, better known by her pseudonym, Pola Oloixarac, is an Argentine writer, journalist, librettist and translator.

Biography
She studied philosophy at the University of Buenos Aires. After finishing her post-graduate studies for Ph.D. at Stanford University she has been living in Barcelona, Spain. 

She has written for publications including The New York Times, The Telegraph, Rolling Stone, Folha de Sao Paulo, Revista Clarín, Etiqueta Negra, Quimera, Brando, América Economía, among other media. She is a founding editor of The Buenos Aires Review, a bilingual journal featuring contemporary literature in the Americas.

Oloixarac has been invited to present her work and views on literature at universities such as Stanford, Harvard, Cornell, Dartmouth, University of Toronto, University of Florida, Americas Society, and literary festivals including Jaipur Literature Festival, LIWRE in Finland, Hay Cartagena, FLIP Brasil, Miami Book Fair, Marathon des Mots in Toulouse, FIL Lima, Crossing Borders Antwerp/The Hague.

Her bestselling first novel, Savage Theories (Las teorías salvajes, 2008), has been translated in French, Dutch, Finnish, Italian and Portuguese. It was published in English translation by Soho Press in January 2017. Savage Theories provoked critical and cultural controversy upon its release, with its subject matter and Oloixarac's public image coming under scrutiny. According to Oloixarac, "[t]he book has sparked verbal violence and a sexist uproar precisely because it doesn't deal with the issues that are traditionally associated with 'women's literature,' but instead contains a sociological critique that is both intelligent and satirical, which are apparently traits solely reserved for men."

Her third novel Mona  (Spanish 2019, in English 2021) shows her as a satirist with some taste for provocation as her Guardian reviewer stated.

Awards and honours
In 2010, she was chosen as one of Granta's Best Young Spanish Novelists. In the same year, she was invited to participate in the International Writing Program at the University of Iowa. She is the recipient of a literary award from the Fondo Nacional de las Artes.

In the UK she was awarded the 2021 Eccles Centre & Hay Festival Writer's Award and is an Eccles fellow at the British Library.

Selected bibliography
 Las teorías salvajes (Buenos Aires: Alpha Decay, 2014)
 Las constelaciones oscuras (Buenos Aires: Random House, 2015)
  Mona (Buenos Aires: Random House, 2019)

In English
 Savage Theories, Roy Kesey, translator (New York: Soho Press, 2017)
 Dark Constellations, Roy Kesey, translator (New York: Soho Press, 2019)
 Mona, Adam Morris, translator (New York: Farrar, Straus, and Giroux; UK London: Serpent's Tail, 2021)

References

External links
 Twitter account

Argentine women writers
1977 births
Living people
Argentine journalists
Argentine translators
International Writing Program alumni
Argentine novelists